The 2010 Liga Super also known as the TM Liga Super for sponsorship reasons is the seventh season of the Liga Super, the top-tier professional football league in Malaysia.

The season was held from 9 January and concluded on 3 August 2010.

The Liga Super champions for 2010 was Selangor.

The opening match of the season between Negeri Sembilan and Selangor also doubled as the Piala Sumbangsih fixtures where it was won by Selangor by a score of 2–1.

Teams
A total of 14 teams compete in the 2010 season which includes the top 11 teams that participated in the 2009 season and champions and runners-up of the 2009 Liga Premier.

The three teams were promoted to complete a total 10 teams including 2009 Liga Premier runners-up T–Team, third-placed Johor and fourth-placed Kuala Lumpur which secured direct promotion to the Liga Super.

  Selangor (2009 Liga Super winner)
  Perlis
  Kedah
  Johor FC
  Terengganu
  Kelantan
  Negeri Sembilan
  PLUS
  Perak
  Penang
  Pahang
  T–Team
  Johor
  Kuala Lumpur

Notes

Stadiums and locations

League table

Results

Season statistics

Top scorers
Including matches played on n/a; Source: FIFA: Liga Super Scorers

See also
 List of Liga Super seasons

References

Malaysia Super League seasons
1
Malaysia
Malaysia